Goniasteridae (the biscuit stars) constitute the largest family of sea stars, included in the order Valvatida. They are mostly deep-dwelling species, but the family also include several colorful shallow tropical species.

Description 

Goniasteridae are usually middle-sized sea stars with a characteristic double range of marginal plates bordering the disk and arms. Most of them have five arms, often short and triangular, around a broad central disc; many species are pentagonal or subpentagonal, covered densely with granular, seed-like protuberances, hence the name of the family "seed-star" (gonium+aster). The aboral face is often covered with tiny spines looking like paxillae. Pedicellariae are often valvate, and the gonads are located at the interradius.

Main identification keys for this group include the presence of paxillae, granules, teeth, spines, or the shape and dimensions of marginal plate.

Location and habitat
They occur predominantly on deep-water continental shelf habitats (but a part of them inhabit shallow waters) in all the world's oceans, being the most diverse in the Indo-Pacific region.

List of genera
About 260 extant species within 70 genera are currently known, which make this family the most diverse of all the sea stars, even if half of the genera are monospecific. Species belonging to the Ferdininae subfamily have been imported from Ophidiasteridae thanks to a large revision of these two families in 2017

According to World Register of Marine Species, this family includes the following genera:

Extinct genera 

Lists of genera containing extinct species according to fossilworks.

References

 
Echinoderm families
Extant Jurassic first appearances